The Romanian calendar is the Gregorian, adopted in 1919. However, the traditional Romanian calendar has its own names for the months. In modern Romania and Moldova, the Gregorian calendar is exclusively used for business and government transactions and predominates in popular use as well. Nevertheless, the traditional names of the months do appear in some contexts, for instance on ecclesiastical calendars produced by the Romanian Orthodox Church.

History
Romania adopted the Gregorian calendar on 1 April 1919, which became 14 April 1919. In 2019, the National Bank of Romania released a commemorative coin of 10 silver lei to celebrate the centenary of Romania's adoption of the calendar.

Traditional month names
All the traditional names of the months are of Latin origin, which indicates that their use predates the Slavic contact around the 8th century. Six months have their names derived from characteristics of the months. Five are derived from the Latin names now used in the Gregorian calendar (and earlier in the Julian calendar). However, each of these has a folk etymology and an additional meaning. The last month, December, derives its name from that of Saint Andrew.

See also
 Gregorian calendar
 Slavic calendar
 Lithuanian calendar
 French Republican calendar

References

Dicționarul explicativ al limbii române, Academia Română, Institutul de Lingvistică "Iorgu Iordan", Editura Univers Enciclopedic, 1998

Romanian culture
Moldovan culture
Months